Charles Schwartz may refer to:
 Charles W. Schwartz (1914–1991), wildlife artist
 Charles Schwartz, Jr. (1922–2012), United States federal judge
 Charles Schwartz (gymnast), American Olympic gymnast

See also 
Sherwood Schwartz (Sherwood Charles Schwartz, 1916–2011), American television producer